Craig Milford Raymond (April 5, 1945 - October 15, 2018) was an American professional basketball player.

Raymond played basketball at Hudson's Bay High School in Vancouver, Washington, where he was named a Parade All-American during his senior year. A 6'11" center from Brigham Young University, Raymond played with Dick Nemelka, Jeff Congdon, and Jim Jimas on BYU teams that competed in the NCAA Tournament in 1965 and in 1966 won the National Invitation Tournament in New York City. In the championship game, he scored 21 points with nearly the same number of rebounds.  He was drafted by the Philadelphia 76ers with the twelfth pick of the 1967 NBA draft. Raymond spent one year with the 76ers, then jumped to the rival American Basketball Association and played four seasons with the Pittsburgh Pipers, the Los Angeles Stars, the Memphis Pros, The Floridians, the San Diego Conquistadors, and the Indiana Pacers. His ABA highlight was an improbable late-season streak with the Los Angeles Stars all the way to the ABA finals against the Indiana Pacers. In his NBA/ABA career, Raymond averaged 6.9 points per game and 6.3 rebounds per game.

Craig was very involved in the Church of Jesus Christ of Latter-day Saints including serving as a Bishop in the San Diego area.  He was married to his wife Carolyn Bodily Raymond for 51 years.

References

External links

College statistics

1945 births
2018 deaths
American expatriate basketball people in Italy
American men's basketball players
Basketball players from Washington (state)
BYU Cougars men's basketball players
Centers (basketball)
Indiana Pacers players
Los Angeles Stars players
Memphis Pros players
Miami Floridians players
Olimpia Milano players
Parade High School All-Americans (boys' basketball)
People from Aberdeen, Washington
Philadelphia 76ers draft picks
Philadelphia 76ers players
Pittsburgh Pipers players
San Diego Conquistadors players
Sportspeople from Vancouver, Washington